Zunil is an impact crater near the Cerberus Fossae on Mars, with a diameter of . It is named after the town of Zunil in Guatemala. The crater is located in the Elysium quadrangle. Visible in images from the Viking 1 and Viking 2 Mars orbiters in the 1970s, Zunil was subsequently imaged at higher resolution for the first time by the Mars Global Surveyor (MGS) Mars Orbiter Camera (MOC) in 2000.

A ray system associated with the Zunil impact, visible in infrared images from the Mars Odyssey Thermal Emission Spectrometer (THEMIS) was later detailed by McEwen et al. (2003); before this, large craters with ray systems had not been seen on Mars.

The debris from a recent landslide was first spotted on the south-east wall of the crater by the Mars Global Surveyor Mars Orbiter Camera (MOC) in 2003, and was subsequently imaged at higher resolution by the Mars Reconnaissance Orbiter High Resolution Imaging Science Experiment (HiRISE) in December 2006.

Formation 

The impact which formed Zunil occurred no more than a few million years ago and hence the crater is in a relatively pristine form. It was probably not produced in a high-velocity impact, such as from a comet. If the interpretation that Zunil is the source of the basaltic shergottite meteorites is correct, then the crater formed in basalt deposited 165–177 million years ago.

Very few of these secondary craters lie within  of Zunil. Around 80% of the craters in Athabasca Valles are Zunil secondaries. If similar impacts also produced comparable amounts of secondaries, this calls into question the accuracy of crater counting as a dating technique for geologically young Martian surface features.

It is possible that some of these fragments from the impact made it to Earth to become shergottites, a form of Martian meteorite.

Research published in the journal Icarus has found pits in Zunil Crater that are caused by hot ejecta falling on ground containing ice. The pits are formed by heat forming steam that rushes out from groups of pits simultaneously, thereby blowing away from the pit ejecta.

See also 

 List of craters on Mars
 List of craters with ray systems

References

External links 
 Themis page about Zunil
 Rayed craters on Mars

Impact craters on Mars
Elysium quadrangle
Extraterrestrial landslides